The 2017 Classic Loire-Atlantique was the 18th edition of the Classic Loire-Atlantique road cycling one day race. It was held on 18 March 2017 as part of UCI Europe Tour in category 1.1.

Teams
Seventeen teams of up to eight riders started the race:

Result

References

2017 UCI Europe Tour
2017 in French sport
Classic Loire-Atlantique